The 2020 Massachusetts House of Representatives election took place on November 3, 2020. It elected members of the Massachusetts House of Representatives. Democrats gained a net 2 seats. One independent Susannah Whipps was also elected. Incumbent Speaker Robert DeLeo was reelected but left the house before the new session to take a position at Northeastern University, he was replaced by Ronald Mariano.

Predictions

Overview

Election

Closest races 
Seats where the margin of victory was under 10%:
  (gain)
 
  (gain)
 
 
 
  (gain)

See also 

 2020 Massachusetts general election
 2020 Massachusetts Senate election
 2019–2020 Massachusetts legislature
 2021–2022 Massachusetts legislature

References 

https://malegislature.gov/Legislators/Leadership/House

Massachusetts House
State House
Massachusetts House of Representatives elections